The blunthead puffer, Sphoeroides pachygaster, is a pufferfish of the family Tetraodontidae, found circumglobally in tropical and temperate seas, at depths between 50 and 500 m. First recorded in the Mediterranean Sea off the Spanish coast in 1981, after entry via the strait of Gibraltar, it invaded the western basin in following decades and now reaches eastward the Adriatic Sea, the Aegean Sea and Levantine waters. Its length is up to 40 cm. It is an edible species, and is commonly eaten in Japan, where it is referred to as 'yorito fugu', and has a lower concentration of tetrodotoxin compared to other species of pufferfish prepared and eaten as fugu, but caution is needed as its liver contains dangerous levels of the toxin, and must not be eaten.

References

 
 Tony Ayling & Geoffrey Cox, Collins Guide to the Sea Fishes of New Zealand,  (William Collins Publishers Ltd, Auckland, New Zealand 1982) 

Tetraodontidae
Fish described in 1848